The 2020–21 California Golden Bears men's basketball team represented the University of California, Berkeley, in the 2020–21 NCAA Division I men's basketball season. In Mark Fox's second year as head coach at California, the Golden Bears played their home games at Haas Pavilion as members of the Pac-12 Conference.

Previous season
The Golden Bears finished the 2019–20 season with a record of 14–18, 7–11 in Pac-12 play to finish in a three-way tie for eighth place. They defeated Stanford in the first round of the Pac-12 tournament and were set to take on UCLA in the quarterfinals before the remainder of the Pac-12 Tournament was cancelled amid the COVID-19 pandemic.

Off-season

Departures

Incoming transfers

2020 recruiting class

2021 recruiting class

Roster

Schedule and results

|-
!colspan=9 style=| Regular season

|-
!colspan=9 style=| Pac-12 tournament
|-

Notes

References

California Golden Bears men's basketball seasons
California
California Golden
California Golden